Evgenia, Evgeniya, Yevgenia or Yevgeniya is a feminine given name which may refer to:

Evgenia or Evgeniya
 Evgeniya Augustinas (born 1988), Russian racing cyclist
 Evgeniya Belyakova (born 1986), Russian basketball player in the Women's National Basketball Association
 Evgenia Chernyshyova, former Soviet pairs figure skater
 Evgeniya Doluhanova (born 1984), Ukrainian chess grandmaster
 Evgenia Filonenko (born 1982), retired Ukrainian pair skater
 Evgeniya Ivanova (Russian water polo) (born 1987)
 Evgeniya Kanayeva (born 1990), Russian individual rhythmic gymnast
 Evgeniya Kosetskaya (born 1994), Russian badminton player
 Evgenia Koutsoudi (born 1984), Greek synchronized swimmer
 Evgeniya Kryukova (born 1971), Soviet and Russian film and theater actress
 Evgeniya Kuznetsova (born 1980), former Olympic gymnast for Russia and later Bulgaria
 Evgenia Linetskaya (born 1986), Russian-born Israeli tennis player
 Evgenia Medvedeva (born 1999), Russian ladies figure skater
 Evgenia Melnik (born 1988), Belarusian figure skater
 Evgenia Obraztsova (born 1984), Russian prima ballerina
 Evgenia Pavlina (born 1978), Belarusian individual rhythmic gymnast
 Evgeniya Pavlova (born 1993), Russian biathlete
 Evgenia Radanova (born 1977), Bulgarian female sportsperson
 Evgeniya Rodina (born 1989), Russian tennis player
 Evgenia Shelgunova (born 1997), Russian artistic gymnast
 Evgenia Shishkova (born 1972), professional pairs figure skater and coach
 Evgenia Tarasova (born 1994), Russian pairs figure skater
 Evgenia Vlasova (born 1978), Ukrainian singer
 Evgenia Zabolotskaya, Russian-American acoustic engineer
 Evgeniya Zakharova (born 1994), Russian short track speed skater

Yevgenia or Yevgeniya
 Yevgenia Albats (born 1958), Russian investigative journalist, political scientist, writer and radio host
 Yevgenia Alissova-Klobukova (1889–1962), Russian botanist
 Yevgenia Bosch (1879–1925), Bolshevik activist, politician and acting leader of the provisional Soviet government of Ukraine in 1917
 Yevgenia Bugoslavskaya (1899–1960), Soviet astronomer
 Yevgeniya Chirikova (born 1976), Russian environmental activist
 Yevgenia Dobrovolskaya (born 1964), Russian actress
 Yevgenia Ginzburg (1904–1977), Russian historian and writer
 Yevgenia Pobedimova (1898–1973), Russian-Soviet botanist and plant collector
 Yevgeniya Rudneva (1920–1944), Soviet (Ukrainian) World War II female combat pilot
 Yevgenia Savranska (born 1984), Israeli-Ukrainian retired tennis player
 Yevgeniya Yermakova (born 1976), retired freestyle swimmer from Kazakhstan

See also

Eugenia (given name)
Evgeniia Lalenkova

Feminine given names